Baron Palmer, of Reading in the County of Berkshire, is a title in the Peerage of the United Kingdom. It was created in 1933 for the businessman and patron of music, Sir Ernest Palmer, 1st Baronet. He had already been created a baronet, of Grosvenor Crescent in the City of Westminster, in the Baronetage of the United Kingdom on 26 January 1916. The Palmer family had made its fortune from their ownership of the firm of Huntley & Palmers, biscuit manufacturers, of Reading.  the titles are held by the first Baron's great-grandson, the fourth Baron, who succeeded his uncle in 1990. He is the son of the Hon. Sir Gordon Palmer, Lord Lieutenant of Berkshire from 1978 to 1989, younger son of the second Baron. Lord Palmer is one of the ninety elected hereditary peers that remain in the House of Lords after the passing of the House of Lords Act 1999, and sits as a cross-bencher.

The family seat is Manderston, near Duns, Berwickshire.

Barons Palmer (1933)
(Samuel) Ernest Palmer, 1st Baron Palmer (1858–1948)
(Ernest) Cecil Nottage Palmer, 2nd Baron Palmer (1882–1950)
Raymond Cecil Palmer, 3rd Baron Palmer (1916–1990)
Adrian Bailie Nottage Palmer, 4th Baron Palmer (b. 1951)

The heir apparent is the present holder's elder son, the Hon. Hugo Bailie Rohan Palmer (b. 1980)

Arms

See also
Palmer Baronets

References

Kidd, Charles, Williamson, David (editors). Debrett's Peerage and Baronetage (1990 edition). New York: St Martin's Press, 1990.

Baronies in the Peerage of the United Kingdom
Noble titles created in 1933